Devendra is a genus of Asian false wolf spiders first described by Pekka T. Lehtinen in 1967. The genus is endemic to Sri Lanka.

Species
 it contains five species:
Devendra amaiti Polotow & Griswold, 2017 — Sri Lanka
Devendra pardalis (Simon, 1898) — Sri Lanka
Devendra pumilus (Simon, 1898) — Sri Lanka
Devendra saama Polotow & Griswold, 2017 — Sri Lanka
Devendra seriatus (Simon, 1898) — Sri Lanka

References

Araneomorphae genera
Zoropsidae
Endemic fauna of Sri Lanka
Taxa named by Pekka T. Lehtinen